Pirurayo is a volcano in the Pirurayo range, Jujuy Province of Argentina.

They were erupted from possibly two vents, although the intense tectonic deformation makes it impossible to tell. These vents probably generated a compound volcano consisting of lava domes, which repeatedly grew and collapsed.

Pirurayo has erupted andesite and dacite, which belong to the potassium-rich volcanics series. They probably formed from a mafic magma, which underwent assimilation of crustal materials and fractional crystallization. Volcaniclastic rocks from Pirurayo form part of the regional Moreta formation. Volcanic activity occurred between 28 ± 3 and 20 ± 2 million years ago. The Pirurayo rocks were later influenced by faulting and hydrothermally altered.

References 

Oligocene volcanoes
Miocene volcanoes
Volcanoes of Jujuy Province